Lupinus diffusus (Oak Ridge lupine, spreading lupine, or sky-blue lupine) is a species of lupine native to the southeastern United States, from North Carolina south to Florida and west to Mississippi. It is restricted to very dry, sandy soils, often in open pine or oak woodlands.

Cultivation

It is grown as an ornamental plant in gardens for its flowers and silvery leaves, produced in early spring.

References and external links
USDA PLants Profile: Lupinus diffusus

Photos of Lupinus diffusus

diffusus
Flora of the Southeastern United States
Flora without expected TNC conservation status